Solana de los Barros is a municipality in the province of Badajoz, Extremadura, Spain. It has a population of 2,657 and an area of 65.09 km².

References

Municipalities in the Province of Badajoz